Connecticut's 69th House of Representatives district elects one member of the Connecticut House of Representatives. It consists of the towns of Bridgewater, Roxbury, Washington, and parts of Southbury. It has been represented by Republican Cindy Harrison since 2021.

Recent elections

2020

2018

2016

2014

2012

References

69